A number of ships of the Holland America Line have been named Statendam, the name of an old dike on the island of Goeree-Overflakkee:
  was an ocean liner launched in 1898 and sold to the Allan Line in 1911, being renamed SS Scotian.
  was an ocean liner launched in 1914. She was taken over in 1916 while still under construction, as the White Star Line's .
 , passenger liner completed in 1927 by Harland and Wolff and set on fire in 1940 to avoid capture.
  was a cruise ship launched in 1956. She was sold in 1982 and renamed Rhapsody, and then Regent Star. She was finally named Sea Harmony and then Harmony I  in 2004, and scrapped later that year.
 , a cruise ship which entered service in 1993
 , a cruise ship which entered service in December 2018, the second Holland America Pinnacle-class ship.

See also
 Statendam-class (S-class) cruise ships of Holland America

Ship names